Bent Rolstad (13 March 1947 – 9 July 2015) was a Norwegian professor of medicine.

He took the cand.med. degree at the University of Oslo in 1975, the dr.med. degree in 1977, specializing in anatomy, and became a professor at the Institute of Basic Medical Sciences there. He was a fellow of the Norwegian Academy of Science and Letters. He resided in Asker. He died while vacationing in Spain in the summer of 2015.

References

1947 births
2015 deaths
Norwegian anatomists
University of Oslo alumni
Academic staff of the University of Oslo
Members of the Norwegian Academy of Science and Letters